Muhammad Sharul Nizam bin Mohd Nadzir (born 15 June 1996) is a Malaysian footballer who plays as a winger for Sri Pahang.

References

External links
 

1996 births
Living people
People from Pahang
Malaysian footballers
Sri Pahang FC players
Malaysia Super League players
Association football defenders